Husdal is a short valley running west-southwest from the head of Husvik Harbour, South Georgia. It was named by the UK Antarctic Place-Names Committee in the Norwegian form "Husdal" (house valley) in association with the disused Husvik whaling station at the head of Husvik Harbour.

References

Valleys of Antarctica